Manilkara multifida is a species of plant in the family Sapotaceae.

The plant is endemic to the Atlantic Forest ecoregion in southeastern Brazil.

It is an IUCN endangered species, threatened by habitat loss.

See also
 Pau Brasil National Park — plant is native in the park.

References

multifida
Endemic flora of Brazil
Flora of the Atlantic Forest
Endangered plants
Endangered biota of South America
Plants described in 1990
Taxonomy articles created by Polbot